Manos is both a surname and a given name. Notable people with the name include:

Surname:
 Aspasia Manos (1896–1972), the Greek wife of Alexander I
 John Michael Manos, (1922–2006), U.S. federal judge
 Stefanos Manos (born 1939), Greek politician
Given name:
 Manos Hadjidakis (1925–1994), Greek composer
 Manos Katrakis (1908–1984), Greek actor
 Manos Loïzos (1937–1982), Greek songwriter
 Manos Papayiannis (born 1966), Greek actor

See also